The following events occurred in July 1963:

July 1, 1963 (Monday)
ZIP Codes were introduced in the United States, as the U.S. Department of the Post Office kicked off a massive advertising campaign that included the cartoon character "Mr. ZIP", and the mailing that day of more than 72,000,000 postcards to every mailing address in the United States, in order to inform the addressees of their new five digit postal code.  Postal zones had been used since 1943 in large cities, but the ZIP code was nationwide.  Use became mandatory in 1967 for bulk mailers.
Kim Philby was named by the Government of the United Kingdom as the 'Third Man' in the Burgess and Maclean Soviet spy ring.
The crash of a Varig DC-3 airliner in Brazil's Rio Grande do Sul state killed 15 of the 18 people on board.  The flight was approaching the airport at Passo Fundo on the second-leg of a scheduled trip from Porto Alegre when it impacted trees.
Died: Abdullah bin Khalifa, 53, Sultan of Zanzibar since 1960, died two days after undergoing emergency surgery.  He was succeeded by his son, Jamshid bin Abdullah, the last to hold the title.

July 2, 1963 (Tuesday)
In a speech while visiting East Berlin, Soviet Premier Nikita Khrushchev endorsed the idea for the first time of a treaty to ban atmospheric testing of nuclear weapons. Khrushchev criticized the idea of sending inspectors to verify compliance, but said that "Since the Western powers obstruct the conclusion of an agreement banning all nuclear tests, the Soviet Government expresses its willingness to conclude an agreement banning nuclear tests in the atmosphere, in outer space and under water."  
Mohawk Airlines Flight 121, a Martin 4-0-4, crashed on takeoff at Rochester, New York, in the United States, killing 7 of the 43 people on board and injuring all 36 survivors.  The plane was flying to White Plains, New York and, according to a witness "just as the craft began roaring down the runway for a take-off torrents of rain and hail pummeled it."
Brian Sternberg, the world record holder for the pole vault, broke his neck after falling from a trampoline, and was left a quadriplegic.
Baseball pitchers Juan Marichal of the San Francisco Giants, and Warren Spahn of the Milwaukee Braves faced off against each other in a National League baseball game that one author would later call "the greatest game ever pitched".  Tied 0-0 after nine innings, the game was won in the 16th by the Giants on a home run by Willie Mays.
Liberace and Barbra Streisand opened a run of shows at the Riviera in Las Vegas, Nevada.
The 13th Berlin International Film Festival concluded.  The Golden Bear was jointly awarded to Il diavolo by Gian Luigi Polidoro and Bushidô zankoku monogatari by Tadashi Imai.
Died: Alicia Patterson, 56, American editor and publisher who founded the newspaper Newsday in 1940 for New York's Long Island, died of complications following surgery for an ulcer.

July 3, 1963 (Wednesday)
National Airways Corporation Flight 441, a Douglas DC-3C, flew into a vertical rock face in New Zealand's Kaimai Ranges near Mount Ngatamahinerua, killing all 23 people on board.
The 100th anniversary of the Battle of Gettysburg, turning point of the American Civil War, was celebrated with a re-enactment of Pickett's charge.
Died: Povl Baumann, 74, Danish architect

July 4, 1963 (Thursday)
The Constitution of Austria was amended to ease the 1919 act that had declared that "In the interest of the security of the Republic the former holders of the Crown and other members of the House of Habsburg-Lothringen are banished from the country", providing an exception for descendants of the former monarchs if they elected to "expressly renounce their membership of this House".
Born:    
Christopher G. Kennedy, U.S. businessman; in Boston, to Robert F. Kennedy and Ethel Skakel Kennedy, the eighth of their eleven children   
Ute Lemper, German singer and actress; in Münster, West Germany   
Jan Mølby, Danish footballer; in Kolding
Died: Bernard Freyberg, 74, Governor-General of New Zealand 1946–1952

July 5, 1963 (Friday)
A delegation from the People's Republic of China, led by Prime Minister Zhou Enlai, departed from Beijing on a train bound for Moscow, to attend talks in an effort to repair the poor relations between the Chinese Communists and Communist Party of the Soviet Union. The talks, intended to mend the Sino-Soviet split, would break down on July 14 when the Soviets published a rebuttal to Chinese charges that the Soviets had departed from the Communist ideology.
Italian Prime Minister Giovanni Leone received a vote of confidence in the Italian Senate, 133–110.
The U.S. Senate set a new record for briefest session by meeting at 9:00 am, and then adjourning three seconds later. There were only two Senators present for the meeting. The previous record for brevity had been a five-second meeting on September 4, 1951.
McDonnell Aircraft Corporation began the first phase of Spacecraft Systems Tests (SST) on the instrumentation pallets to be installed in Gemini spacecraft No. 1. Numerous troubles brought a halt to SST on July 21 for two weeks of corrective action, including the return of one telemetry transmitter and the C-band beacon to the vendors for out-of-specification performance. Phase I of SST resumed August 5 and was completed well within test specifications August 21.
The first engineering prototype Gemini inertial guidance system underwent integration and compatibility testing with a complete guidance and control system at McDonnell. All spacecraft wiring was found to be compatible with the computer, and the component operated with complete accuracy.
The sale of liquor, by the drink, was legal in the U.S. state of Iowa for the first time in more than 40 years, with "a restaurant in the lakes resort area in northwest Iowa" becoming the site of the first legal drink.

July 6, 1963 (Saturday)
The Roman Catholic Church relaxed the ban on cremation as a funeral practice, when Pope Paul VI issued the Instruction that "the burning of the body, after all, has no effect on the soul, nor does it inhibit Almighty God from re-establishing the body", although the decision would not be revealed until May 2, 1964.
The Vanoise National Park, located in the department of Savoie in the French Alps, was designated France's first National Park.
Elections were held in Jordan for the 80 seats in the Chamber of Deputies of the National Assembly.  All of the candidates were independent, in that political parties were banned at the time, and the results, as with most of the elections in Jordan to that time, were "poorly documented" and not officially published.
A partial lunar eclipse took place.
Died: George, Duke of Mecklenburg, 63, head of the House of Mecklenburg-Strelitz since 1934. He was succeeded by his son Georg Alexander.

July 7, 1963 (Sunday)
In the first round of Argentina's presidential election, Dr. Arturo Illia won a 25 percent plurality of the popular votes (2,441,064) and 169 of the 476 Electoral College votes, seventy short of a majority.  Another physician, Dr. Oscar Alende, finished with 16.4%, and former General Pedro Aramburu was third.  On July 31, electors for several of the other parties would vote for Illia, giving him 270 electoral votes.  Dr. Illia's Radical Civic Union (UCR) Party (UCR) won only 72 of the 192 seats in the Chamber of Deputies, and Illia did not try to forge a coalition with the other parties.
Seven people, including four children, were killed, and 17 injured, when a pilotless FJ-4 Fury jet fighter crashed into gatherers at a family reunion at the Green Hills Day Camp in Willow Grove, Pennsylvania.  The pilot had ejected after plane malfunctioned while he was attempting to land at the nearby Willow Grove Naval Air Station, and the jet crashed into a baseball field, killing one man, then skidded into a bathhouse where 50 people had been swimming or standing around the pool. 
In a fight between South Vietnamese government police and U.S. reporters, secret police loyal to Ngô Đình Nhu, brother of President Ngô Đình Diệm, attacked American journalists including Peter Arnett and David Halberstam at a demonstration during the Buddhist crisis.
Died: Frank P. Lahm, 85, U.S. aviation pioneer who became, in 1909, the first military aviator after being selected by the U.S. Army to receive instruction on the Wright Flyer by Wilbur Wright

July 8, 1963 (Monday)
Three crewmen of the British cargo ship Patrician were killed after it collided with the U.S. ship Santa Emilia and sank off Gibraltar. Thirty-four of the 37 crew were rescued by Santa Emilia.
The British comic strip Fred Basset was introduced, starting with its first appearance in the Daily Mail. Created by Scottish cartoonist Alex Graham, the strip, about the adventures of a basset hound, is syndicated worldwide.  
Members of the 1963 American Everest Expedition team were awarded the Hubbard Medal by U.S. President John F. Kennedy for their achievement.
McDonnell warned Gemini Project Office that the capacity of the Gemini Guidance Computer was in danger of being exceeded. The original function of the computer had been limited to providing rendezvous and reentry guidance. Other functions were subsequently added, and the computer's spare capacity no longer appeared adequate to handle all of them. McDonnell requested an immediate review of computer requirements. In the meantime, it advised International Business Machines to delete one of the added functions, orbital navigation, from computers for spacecraft Nos. 2 and 3.

July 9, 1963 (Tuesday)
The "20-point agreement" to create the Federation of Malaysia, effective September 16, was signed in London by the UK Prime Minister Harold Macmillan and representatives of four of the five intended members of Malaysia: the Federation of Malaya, the Crown Colony of North Borneo (which became the state of Sabah), State of Sarawak and the state of Singapore. The fifth member, the British protectorate over the Sultanate of Brunei, declined to join the Federation. The state of Singapore would be expelled from the Federation of Malaysia on August 9, 1965 and would become an independent republic.
The Gemini Phase I Centrifuge Program began at Naval Air Development Center, using the Aviation Medical Acceleration Laboratory centrifuge equipped to simulate the command pilot's position in the Gemini spacecraft. The program had two parts: an engineering evaluation of command pilot controls and displays required for the launch and reentry phases of the Gemini mission, including evaluation of prototype Gemini seat contours, pressure suit operation under acceleration, and the restraint system; and pilot familiarization with Gemini launch, reentry, and selected abort reentry acceleration profiles. The engineering evaluation was completed August 2. Pilot familiarization was conducted between July 16 and August 17. The participating astronauts were generally satisfied with the design and operation of displays and controls, though they recommended some minor operational changes. They were unable to cope with the reentry tasks without undue difficulty, even under the high acceleration of extreme abort conditions.
During evaluation of the G2C Gemini pressure suit in the engineering mock-up of the Gemini spacecraft at McDonnell, the suit torso was found to have been stretched out of shape, making it an unsatisfactory fit. David Clark Company had delivered the suit to McDonnell earlier in July. Evaluation in the mock-up also revealed that the helmet visor guard, by increasing the height of the helmet, compounded the problem of interference between the helmet and the spacecraft hatch. After preliminary evaluation, McDonnell returned the suit to David Clark with instructions to modify the helmet design to eliminate the fixed visor guard and to correct the torso fit problem. Final evaluation and start of production was delayed for about 6 weeks while the prototype suit was being reworked.

July 10, 1963 (Wednesday)
A Vostok-2 launched by the USSR failed shortly after take-off.
Project Emily, the deployment of American-built PGM-17 Thor Intermediate-range ballistic missiles in the United Kingdom, was disbanded.
The brief partnership of "Rodgers and Lerner" was dissolved, and production of the first Rodgers-Lerner musical, I Picked a Daisy, was halted permanently. Composer Richard Rodgers had successfully collaborated with lyricist Lorenz Hart (Babes in Arms), and then with lyricist Oscar Hammerstein II (The Sound of Music), while lyricist Alan Jay Lerner had a successful team with composer Frederick Loewe (My Fair Lady). The two were unable to work together successfully beyond "half a dozen" songs for Daisy.
The all-white University of South Carolina was ordered to admit its first African-American student, Henri Monteith, by order of U.S. District Judge J. Robert Martin. On the same day, Judge Martin ordered the desegregation of all 26 of South Carolina's state parks.
In a report to the Aeronautics and Astronautics Coordinating Board, Director of Manned Space Flight D. Brainerd Holmes and Air Force Undersecretary Brockway McMillan, cochairmen of the Manned Space Flight Panel, set forth a number of recommendations for bringing about a closer coordination between NASA and the U.S. Department of Defense (DOD) in crewed space station studies. Although some coordination between the two agencies already existed, direct contact was inadequate, especially at the technical level. Holmes requested all NASA program offices and those field centers involved in space station work to comply with the Panel's recommendations for thorough interchange of study work and information with DOD.

July 11, 1963 (Thursday)
In South Africa, 19 ANC and MK leaders, including Arthur Goldreich and Walter Sisulu, were arrested at Liliesleaf Farm, Rivonia, the headquarters of Umkhonto we Sizwe.
A military coup ousted Carlos Julio Arosemena Monroy, President of Ecuador, who was succeeded by naval commander Ramón Castro Jijón. After surrendering the presidential palace, Arosemena was placed on an Ecuadorian Air Force plane and flown to Panama. The "final straw" for the coup leaders had been a state dinner the night before, "when the obviously inebriated president made disparaging remarks about the United States" while talking to the American ambassador. 
The sinking of the Argentine ferry Ciudad de Asunción killed 53 of the 420 people on board after the boat caught fire and went down in the River Plate between Buenos Aires in Argentina and Montevideo in  Uruguay.
Walter C. Williams, Deputy Director for Mission Requirements and Flight Operations, Manned Spacecraft Center (MSC), and NASA Director of Flight Operations, wrote to Major General Leighton I. Davis, DOD Representative for Project Gemini Operations, summarizing the range safety problems inherent in the Gemini program which had been identified jointly by representatives of Range Safety Office, MSC, and contractors. The major unresolved problems concerned the effects of a catastrophic failure of the launch vehicle. In September Aerojet-General began a test program comparing cryogenic and hypergolic propellants, which showed that hypergolic propellants burn rather than explode if tanks rupture.
Born: Al MacInnis, Canadian NHL and Olympic champion ice hockey defenceman who played in 1,416 games from 1982 to 2003; in Port Hood, Municipality of the County of Inverness, Nova Scotia

July 12, 1963 (Friday)
The Congress of the Philippines approved a land reform program that had been proposed by President Diosdado Macapagal. Among other things, the law outlawed sharecropping and provided for a means of large estates to be gradually turned over to the people who farmed them.
Pauline Reade, 16, was abducted and murdered by Myra Hindley and Ian Brady in Manchester, England, in the first of the "Moors murders". Reade's remains would not be discovered until July 1, 1987.
Gemini Project Office (GPO) completed a test program on the centrifuge at Ames Research Center to evaluate the effects on pilot performance of longitudinal oscillations (POGO) of the Gemini launch vehicle. When subjected to oscillatory g-loads ranging from 0 to ± 3g superimposed on a steady-state load of 3.5g, pilot perception and performance decreased markedly above ± 0.25g. Primary effects were impaired pilot vision, reduced eye scan rate, masked sensory perception and kinesthetic cues, and degraded speech. GPO reconfirmed the need to reduce POGO to a maximum of 0.25g.
Acting Manager Charles W. Mathews informed Manned Spacecraft Center (MSC) senior staff that Gemini Project Office was exploring the possibility of backing up the first Gemini flight with a payload consisting of a boilerplate reentry module and a production adapter. NASA Headquarters approved the additional flight article in August and requested that the mission be designated Gemini-Titan (GT) 1A. Estimated cost was $1.5 to $2 million. The boilerplate to be used was originally planned for flotation tests at MSC. It was manufactured by local contractors and modified by MSC after it was delivered in September. The adapter, identical in configuration and instrumentation to the one used for spacecraft No. 1, was to be shipped directly from McDonnell to Cape Canaveral, along with telemetry equipment and wiring harnesses to be installed in the boilerplate at the Cape. The GT-1A mission, if it were flown, would be identical to GT-1, but it would be flown only if GT-1 failed to achieve its objectives. Boilerplate flight article 1A left for the Cape on December 13.
The first "Gambit" military reconnaissance satellite was launched from Vandenberg Air Force Base in California at 1:44 p.m., and the film recovered proved it to be a major advancement in observation.
Died: Slatan Dudow, 60, Bulgarian film director and screenwriter

July 13, 1963 (Saturday)
The Legislative Assembly of the Cook Islands voted unanimously to reject an offer by New Zealand to be granted independence, and chose instead to become a self-governing Associated State with its residents to remain New Zealand citizens.
The Pulau Senang prison riot took place at the experimental offshore penal colony in Singapore. Superintendent Daniel Dutton and several prison officers were murdered by inmates and the prison was burned to the ground.
In the Soviet Union, 33 of the 35 persons on Aeroflot Flight 012 were killed when the plane crashed as it was approaching a landing at the Irkutsk Airport in Siberia.  The Tupolev Tu-104 had departed Beijing in China, bound for Moscow, with one scheduled stop in Irkutsk.
Bob Charles defeated Phil Rodgers in a 36-hole playoff to win the British Open. Charles became the first left-handed golfer to win one of golf's major championships.  
The Roman Catholic Diocese of Santiago de Veraguas was erected.
Died: Blessed Carlos Manuel Rodríguez Santiago, 44, first layperson in the history of the United States to be beatified. (cancer)

July 14, 1963 (Sunday)
U.S. Undersecretary of State W. Averell Harriman arrived in Moscow in order to negotiate the nuclear test ban treaty, and brought with him three tons of American telephone and telex equipment to set up the Moscow–Washington hotline agreed upon by the Americans and Soviets on June 20.
France's Jacques Anquetil won the 50th Tour de France.
Died: Sivananda Saraswati, 75, Hindu spiritual leader

July 15, 1963 (Monday)
The Kingdom of Tonga issued the first round postage stamps in history. The stamps (which were also the first to be made of gold foil rather than paper) were designed to commemorate the first gold coins in Polynesia.
Development tests of the Agena Model 8247 main engine at Arnold Engineering Development Center ended when the latch-type gas generator valve failed in testing, making an emergency shutdown of the engine necessary. The wrong choice of emergency shutdown procedures caused turbine overspeed and total failure of the engine's turbine pump assembly. As a result of this failure, the valve was redesigned. Because success of the new design was doubtful, a parallel program was initiated to design and develop an alternative valve configuration, solenoid-operated rather than latch-type. Intensive development testing followed; and in a meeting at Bell Aerosystems on November 15, the solenoid type was selected for use in the first flight system of the Agena target vehicle. The new valve allowed significant reductions in engine complexity and increased reliability, but the development effort imposed a serious delay in Preliminary Flight Rating Tests, which had been scheduled to begin in September 1963.
Born: Brigitte Nielsen, Danish model and actress, known for Rocky IV and Beverly Hills Cop II; in Rødovre
Died: Rear Admiral Gilbert Jonathan Rowcliff, 81, U.S. Navy officer and former Judge Advocate General of the Navy

July 16, 1963 (Tuesday)
The Peerage Act 1963 was approved by the House of Lords, 105 to 25. The change of rules, which received royal assent on July 31, cleared the way for hereditary peers within the House of Lords to disclaim their peerages in order to be allowed to run for and take a seat in the elected House of Commons. Tony Benn, who lost his seat in Commons in 1960 when he inherited the title of Viscount Stansgate and automatically became a member of the House of Lords, disqualified himself under the new law and successfully ran for office under in a by-election.
At Seattle, five men began a 30-day engineering test of life support systems for a crewed space station in The Boeing Company space chamber. The system, designed and built for NASA's Office of Advanced Research and Technology, was the nation's first to include all life-support equipment for a multi-person, long-duration space mission (including environmental control, waste disposal, and crew hygiene and food techniques). In addition to the life support equipment, a number of crew tests simulated specific problems of spaceflight. Five days later, however, the simulated mission was halted because of a faulty reactor tank.
Born:
Phoebe Cates, American actress; in New York City
Fatboy Slim (stage name for Norman Quentin Cook), English musician and record producer; in Bromley, Kent
Paul Hipp, American actor and musician; in Philadelphia
Srečko Katanec, Slovenian soccer football midfielder with 31 games for the Yugoslav national team, later manager who coached the national teams of five different countries (Slovenia, Macedonia, the United Arab Emirates, Iraq and Uzbekistan); in Ljubljana, SR Slovenia, Yugoslavia

July 17, 1963 (Wednesday)
For the first time in history, a U.S. federal court issued an order changing the makeup of the legislature of a U.S. state, revising the number of seats in the Oklahoma House of Representatives (from 120 to 100) and ordering a reapportionment of both the house and the state Senate on a strict population basis.  The decision was the first to rely on the U.S. Supreme Court case of Baker v. Carr, decided on March 26, 1962, holding that federal courts could review state legislative apportionment.<ref>"Redistricting by U.S. Court Ends Rural Domination in Oklahoma", '"The New York Times, July 18, 1963, p. 9</ref>
The final launch was made from the Cape Canaveral Air Force Station Launch Complex 21.
Born: King Letsie III of Lesotho; as David Mohato Bereng Seeiso in Morija, Basutoland colony

July 18, 1963 (Thursday)
Colonel Jassem Alwan of the Syrian army, backed by financing from President Gamal Abdel Nasser of Egypt, led an attempt to overthrow the government of Syria in order to establish a pro-Nasser government that would reunite with the United Arab Republic. The coup attempt came only 30 minutes after President Lu'ay al-Atassi had departed from Damascus on an invitation from President Nasser for a meeting in Egypt. After Alwan seized the Damascus radio station and the Syrian Army headquarters, Interior Minister Amin al-Hafiz, "sub-machinegun in hand", directed the Ba'ath Party National Guard on a counterattack and regained control. Hundreds of people were killed in the battle; Alwan was able to escape, but 27 officers who had participated in the coup were executed by firing squad, marking an end of "the time-honoured tradition whereby losers were banished to embassies abroad". President Atassi would resign on July 27 in protest over the brutal treatment of the coup leaders. 
Olympiacos F.C. won the final of the Greek Cup football competition, 3 to 0 over Pierikos.
In support of the Paraglider Landing System Program, Ames Research Center began wind tunnel tests of a half-scale paraglider test vehicle. Principle objectives of these tests were to obtain data on the longitudinal aerodynamic characteristics, lateral aerodynamic stability characteristics, and the static deployment characteristics of the new low-lobe wing which North American and NASA had jointly agreed on. The new configuration was expected to present lateral stability problems. This series of tests ended August 8.
Born: Marc Girardelli, Austrian Olympic alpine ski racer; in Lustenau

July 19, 1963 (Friday)
An artificial heart pump was placed inside a human being for the first time, at the Methodist Hospital in Houston, Texas University of Houston by a team led by Dr. Michael E. DeBakey. The unidentified patient survived for four days before dying of complications from pneumonia.
A  bomb was dropped on downtown San Francisco, inadvertently, by a U.S. Navy Reserve pilot on a routine exercise flight. The unarmed bomb fell at the intersection of Market Street and Front Street, bounced over the eight-story tall IBM building and damaged another building three blocks away, but nobody was injured.
Died: Guy Scholefield, 86, New Zealand archivist who compiled the Dictionary of New Zealand BiographyJuly 20, 1963 (Saturday)
An attempt to reconcile the differences between the Soviet Communist Party and the Chinese Communist Party ended in failure, after more than a week of conferences in Moscow.
The first Yaoundé Convention was signed in the capital of Cameroon by 18 African nations that had gained independence relatively recently. It would take effect on June 1, 1964, and be operative for five years. Parties to the agreement were Burundi, Cameroon, the Central African Republic, Chad, the Republic of the Congo (Brazzaville), the Republic of the Congo (Leopoldville), Dahomey, Gabon, the Ivory Coast, the Malagasy Republic, Mali, Mauritania, Niger, Rwanda, Senegal, Somalia, Togo, and Upper Volta. After the expiration on May 31, 1969, a new convention would be signed at Yaoundé on July 29 of that year.
For the first time since June 30, 1954, a total solar eclipse was visible from North America and was "the most scientifically observed eclipse in history" up to that time. A chartered DC-8 jet airplane flew a group of astronomers along the path of the eclipse so that the totality could be observed for 44 seconds longer than for people on the ground. The point of greatest eclipse was in Canada's Northwest Territory, near its border with Alberta.
The sinking of the British ore carrier freighter Tritonica killed 33 of its 42-member crew after it collided with another British ship, the Roonagh Head, and went down within four minutes in the St Lawrence River in Canada near Petite-Rivière-Saint-François, Quebec. Most of the Tritonica crew had been sleeping when the ships collided at 3:00 in the morning and were unable to escape in time.
Mary Mills won the 1963 U.S. Women's Open in golf.
Su Mac Lad won the International Trot harness racing event on Long Island, bringing his career winnings to $687,549, the most of any pacer or trotter as of that date.
Gemini Project Office reported that the fuel cell development had slipped, although the amount of slippage had not been completely estimated. Causes of the slippage had been rejection of vendor parts, extension of vendor delivery schedules, and lack of early determination of production procedures.

July 21, 1963 (Sunday)
Jack Nicklaus, 23, described in The New York Times as "a young man who has achieved more in 13 months than most golfers do in a life-time", won the Professional Golf Association championship. In the 72-hole tournament, held in Dallas and one of the professional golf major competitions, Nicklaus had a score of 279, two strokes ahead of runner-up Dave Ragan, who finished at 281. Nicklaus had won the 1962 U.S. Open on June 17, 1962, in only his 17th game on the PGA Tour, and the 1963 Masters Tournament on April 7.
Died: Ray Platte, 37, American stock car driver, died of a skull fracture sustained the previous day during a 100-lap NASCAR race at the speedway in South Boston, Virginia.

July 22, 1963 (Monday)
Sarawak was granted conditional independence from the British Empire pending the establishment of the Federation of Malaysia.
World heavyweight boxing champion Sonny Liston retained his title in a rematch fight against former champion Floyd Patterson, whom he had defeated ten months earlier, on September 20, 1962. In the first bout, he knocked out Patterson in the first round in two minutes, six seconds. In the rematch at Las Vegas, Liston took four seconds longer.Please Please Me became the first record album by The Beatles to be released in the United States. Vee Jay Records deleted two of the songs that had appeared on the British version introduced on March 22, including the title song, "Please Please Me".

July 24, 1963 (Wednesday)
John F. Kennedy, the 35th U.S. President, hosted a group of American high school students who were part of the Boys Nation event sponsored by the American Legion, including 16-year-old Bill Clinton, who would become the 42nd U.S. President in 1993. Clinton would later use a film clip of him shaking hands with Kennedy as part of his 1992 campaign.
Victor Marijnen became the new Prime Minister of the Netherlands, replacing Jan de Quay.  
Born: Karl Malone, American NBA basketball forward, nicknamed "The Mailman" for his reliable delivery of scores, NBA Most Valuable Player 1997 and 1999; in Summerfield, Louisiana
Died:  U.S. Navy Lieutenant Commander Hal Russell Crandall, 34, one of 12 finalists for the selection of NASA Astronaut Group 1 (the first U.S. astronauts, known as the "Mercury Seven"), was killed in the crash of his F-8 Crusader into Subic Bay in the Philippines. In 1959, Crandall had been one of the 32 finalists for the Mercury program, and remained after the group had been reduced to 27 and then 12 before seven were selected by NASA.

July 25, 1963 (Thursday)
Representatives of the United States, the United Kingdom and the Soviet Union initialed the Partial Nuclear Test Ban Treaty, the first agreement ever for the banning of nuclear weapons tests in the atmosphere, outer space and underwater.  Soviet Foreign Minister Andrei Gromyko, U.S. Undersecretary of State W. Averell Harriman, and the British Minister of Science, Lord Hailsham, gave their tentative approval at the Spiridonovka Palace in Moscow, in advance of the formal signing. 
South Korea introduced the Order of Diplomatic Service Merit for meritorious service to the extension of national prestige overseas and to the promotion of friendship with other nations.
Died: Ugo Cerletti, 85, Italian neurologist and pioneer of electroconvulsive therapy in psychiatry.

July 26, 1963 (Friday)
NASA launched Syncom 2, the world's first geostationary (synchronous) satellite.
An earthquake killed 1,800 people in Skopje in Yugoslavia (now in North Macedonia). The earthquake struck at 5:17 a.m. local time.

July 27, 1963 (Saturday)
The computer science study of analysis of algorithms was initiated by the publication of "Notes on Open Addressing", by Donald Knuth.
Syria's Lu'ay al-Atassi, whom rebels loyal to the United Arab Republic had attempted to overthrow on July 18, resigned as both the Chairman of the Syrian Revolutionary Council, equivalent to the president of the Middle Eastern republic and as Commander in Chief of the Syrian Army, and was replaced in both jobs by the Deputy Premier, Major General Amin al-Hafiz, who was also Minister of Defense and Minister of the Interior. Although no explanation was given at the time for Atassi's sudden departure, a later account said that he quit because of Hafiz's order of execution of 27 of the rebels by firing squad.  brutal treatment of the coup leaders. 
Died: 
Garrett Morgan, 86, African-American inventor known for inventing the smoke hood (in 1912) and a hair-straightening product, and the automatic "semaphore arms" traffic light.
Vasile Luca, 65, former Romanian Vice-Premier who had been imprisoned since 1952 following his purge from the Romanian Communist Party Politburo.

July 28, 1963 (Sunday)
United Arab Airlines Flight 869, a de Havilland Comet 4C, crashed into the Arabian Sea on approach to Bombay-Santa Cruz Airport in Mumbai, India, in heavy rain and turbulence, killing all 63 people on board. Among the dead were 26 Boy Scouts from the Philippines on their way to the 11th World Scout Jamboree in Greece.  The early morning accident happened at 1:50 a.m., local time (2020 on July 27 GMT).  On July 19, 1962, another UAA Flight 869, also a de Havilland Comet 4C, had crashed on its approach to Bangkok, killing all 26 people on board. 
Fernando Belaúnde Terry was inaugurated as President of Peru.  The former architect succeeded General Francisco Morales Bermúdez, who transferred power to the civilian government after elections were held.  Belaúnde would be overthrown in a military coup on October 3, 1968, but would be elected President again in 1980, serving until 1985.
Three days after the Nuclear Test Ban Treaty was initialed in Moscow, the Soviet Defense Minister, Marshal Rodion Malinovsky, published an announcement in Red Star and in Pravda, indicating the military's opposition to Premier Khrushchev's treaty with the "imperialist camp".
George F. Kennan resigned as United States Ambassador to Yugoslavia because of the worsening state of relations between the two countries.
Died: Carl F. W. Borgward, 72, German engineer and automobile manufacturer

July 29, 1963 (Monday)
The Los Angeles Herald-Examiner published its copyrighted story, "Black Muslim Founder Exposed as a White", that W. D. Fard, who had started the black nationalist organization in 1930, had actually been a white man named Wallace Dodd.  The Herald-Examiner story  included photographs supplied by the FBI, but Fard's successors at the Nation of Islam denied the story as a hoax.
The Tu-124A prototype, SSSR-45075, made its first flight.
West Indies defeated England in the 4th Test (cricket) by 221 runs, at Headingley, Leeds.

July 30, 1963 (Tuesday)
The Soviet newspaper Izvestia, and Radio Moscow, reported that Kim Philby, a double agent who had been spying for the Soviets while employed by Britain's MI5 spy agency, had been given asylum in Moscow. Philby had disappeared on January 23.
At the request of NASA HQ, MSC contracted with North American to determine what engineering modifications to the basic Apollo spacecraft would be required to extend that vehicle's mission capabilities to a 100-day orbital lifetime. Although the study contract was handled chiefly by the Space Vehicle Design Branch of the Spacecraft Technology Division, Engineering and Development Director Maxime A. Faget requested that all elements of his directorate lend support as required to achieve a meaningful and useful effort, including in-house study efforts if needed. He stated that two separate vehicles were under consideration, an Apollo command module and a command module and separate mission module to be used as living quarters.
Born: Lisa Kudrow, American TV actress and Emmy Award winner for portraying Phoebe on the TV series Friends''; in Encino, California
Died: Patrick J. Hurley, 80, U.S. Secretary of War 1929–1933

July 31, 1963 (Wednesday)
The Manila Accord of the Diosdado Macapagal initiative was signed by the Federation of Malaya, the Republic of Indonesia and the Republic of the Philippines.
The Peerage Act 1963 received royal assent in the United Kingdom, opening membership in the House of Lords to women, and to more than the 16 members of the peerage of Scotland. In addition, the Act allowed an hereditary peer to disclaim his automatic membership among the Lords, which would clear the way for Alec Douglas-Home to become a member of the House of Commons, then Prime Minister.
Dr. Arturo Illia was formally elected as President of Argentina by that nation's electoral college, receiving 261 of the 576 votes. Minutes later, former President Arturo Frondizi was released by the military government that had deposed him on March 29, 1962. Dr. Illia would be inaugurated on October 12.
The Tupamaros (officially, the Movimiento de Liberacion Nacional or MLN), a terrorist organization seeking to overthrow the government of Uruguay and to rid the South American nation of American and Brazilian businesses, carried out their first attack, striking at a gun club in Montevideo.
United Nations Security Council Resolution 180 was adopted, calling upon Portugal to recognize the right of the peoples of its colonial empire to self-determination and independence. The United Kingdom, the United States and France, three of the five permanent members of the Council, abstained.
Electronic-Electrical Interference (EEI) Tests of Gemini launch vehicle (GLV) 1 began in the vertical test facility at Martin-Baltimore, following a review by Air Force Space Systems Division and Aerospace of data from Sub-system Verification Tests. Purpose of EEI was to uncover any interference between GLV electrical and electronic systems. In the second EEI (August 2), five systems were found to produce unacceptable interference. Two systems still did not meet specification in the third EEI (August 10), but all interference problems were eliminated in the fourth (August 20). After modification of the flight control system, a fifth EEI revealed minor interference (September 3), all of which was cleared up in the final test on September 5. Problems were resolved by adding filters and grounds to aerospace ground equipment and airborne circuits. EEI tests were performed in conjunction with Combined Systems Tests, which began August 2.
Paul Foytack of the California Angels became the first Major League Baseball pitcher to surrender four consecutive home runs, during the sixth inning of a 9-5 loss to the Cleveland Indians. Only one other player accomplished the feat, when Chase Wright of the New York Yankees gave up four homers in a row in a 7-6 loss to the Boston Red Sox on April 22, 2007.
Born: Fatboy Slim (born Quentin Cook), British musician, DJ and record producer, in Bromley, Kent, England

References

1963
1963-07
1963-07